The New Zealand International Exhibition (the biggest in the country to that time) opened on 1 November 1906 in Hagley Park, Christchurch, New Zealand. Nearly two million people visited the exhibition during the next few months. A  branch railway line was built in late 1905 across North Hagley Park starting at the Riccarton station to service the exhibition (goods traffic only) and a temporary tram line was built in Peterborough Street, Park Terrace and Salisbury Street to connect with the Victoria Street tram. The attractions included New Zealand's first professional symphony orchestra (conducted by Alfred Hill), and the first Dominion pipe band contest, which was won by the Dunedin Highland Pipe Band.

Amusements included a water chute on Victoria Lake, a dragon train, a toboggan course, a helter-skelter and a gondola. The Pike featured penny in the slot machines, a maze, and Professor Renno and his Palace of Illusions. Visitors were also able to view a 360 degree panoramic painting of the Battle of Gettysburg, accompanied by a history of the battle, at the Cyclorama.

The exhibition closed on 15 April 1907 and the remaining buildings had been removed by the end of August 1907.

The architect for the buildings was Joseph Maddison. He also designed the Carlton Hotel, which was commissioned by the Wards's Brewery to be built in time for the International Exhibition.

References

World's fairs in New Zealand
1906 in New Zealand
History of Christchurch
Festivals in Christchurch
1900s in Christchurch